Arikkulam  is a village in Kozhikode district in the state of Kerala, India. It's a grampanchayat situated in kozhikode district. Veliyannur challi is situated in arikkulam.  Oravinkal temple js a famous temple which is situated in arikkulam.

Geography

Demography

Arikkulam had a population of 17143 with 8305 males and 8838 females.

The name derives from ari, which means foe and kulam in the vernacular means pool.
hence, arikkulam is a pool of enemies.  As the name indicates, this place might have been drenched with human blood either in an internecine or religious feud.

Arikkulath Nambi, a vassal of Zamorin of calicut is said to have held sway over this area.
Its history is shrouded in mystery.  though attempts have been made to write the history of Arikkulam, nothing fruitful emerged from them.  In this connection, a seminar was held at the
Arikkulam panchayat office a year ago in which noted academics like Pavithran master and Dinesan of Naderi participated. Will Arikkulam give us a savant who will unravel its past?

There is also a derived fable that the village of Arikkulam was initially called as "Harikulam", "Hari" meaning Lord Vishnu and "kulam" meaning pool together meaning "Lord Vishnu's pool". This may be the reason why the village has a temple devoted the formerly mentioned lord "Areekkunnath Vishnu Temple". Another local temple of this area is the "Oravingal Bhagavathi temple".

The village is also a wonderful location for ornithologists with the location of several Kavu around it.

Economy
Economy of Arikkulam revolves around farming, fishing, local businesses and remittance from Gulf.

Transportation

Nearest Railway Station- Koyilandy Railway station.
Nearest Airport- Calicut Airport, approx. 50 km away.
Road- Arikkulam is well connected by road as the National Highway 17 passes through the nearest town Koyilandy.

See also
 Moodadi
 Chengottukavu
 Naduvannur
 Thikkodi
 Chemancheri
 Kappad
 Atholi
 Ulliyeri
 Cheekilode
 Nochad
 Koyilandy

References

http://wikimapia.org/3218487/ARIKULAM-VILLAGE

Koyilandy area

bn:কুইলন্দ্য
bpy:কুইলন্দ্য
it:Koyilandy
ml:കൊയിലാണ്ടി
vi:Koyilandy